The Beauford H. Jester III Unit (J3) is a Texas Department of Criminal Justice (TDCJ) prison farm located in unincorporated Fort Bend County, Texas, United States. Together with its trusty camp, it houses 1,131 inmates.

The unit was named after Governor of Texas Beauford H. Jester, the namesake for the entire prison farm. Jester III opened in 1982. The land that Jester III sits on was purchased in 1885 by the state.

In 2011 the prison's garment plant closed, and its operations were consolidated with the garment plant at Eastham Unit.

In 2011 a middle school, James Bowie Middle School, and a strip commercial center opened across the street from Jester III and Jester IV Unit.

Gallery

References

External links

 "Jester III Unit." Texas Department of Criminal Justice. Retrieved on May 9, 2010.

Prisons in Fort Bend County, Texas
Buildings and structures in Fort Bend County, Texas
1982 establishments in Texas